CQED may refer to:

 Cavity quantum electrodynamics (CQED)
 Circuit quantum electrodynamics (cQED)

See also

 
 QED (disambiguation)